"Shadow of a Pale Horse" was a television play written by Bruce Stewart which was produced for British, US and Australian TV.

Bruce Stewart was a New Zealand playwright who moved to London to work as a writer and actor. Shadow of a Pale Horse won him a Silver Dagger Award of the Mystery Writers of America.

Plot
Set in the 19th century in the New South Wales town of Cobar, a young man is found battered to death. A man called Jem is found next to him, drunk, and is accused of the crime. Jem is arrested but floods prevent him from being transported for trial.

Condringer, an old German prospector, suggests the town hold its own trial. Rigger, the father of the murdered youth, is given the job of defending Jem. Kirk, the dead youth's employer, is given the job of prosecuting him.

1959 British television version
The play was first presented on English TV in 1959 starring Patrick McGoohan.

Bruce Stewart had arrived in England three years previously to work as an actor. The play was very well received.

The play was later Broadcast on Canadian TV.

1960 British television version
It was filmed again for English TV in January 1960 starring Patrick Macnee.

1960 US television version

It screened on US TV as part of the US Steel Hour on CBS on 20 June 1960. Although adapted by Jack Palmer from Stewart's original script, the Australian setting was kept.

Cast
 Dan Duryea
 Frank Lovejoy
 Carroll O'Connor

Reception
The Washington Post called it a "stimulating, above average production".

The New York Times called it "an unusual story, enhanced by a good production".

The US Steel Hour would later film another Stewart play The Devil Makes Sunday.

1960 Australian television version

The play was produced for Australian TV by Sydney station ATN-7, it was also shown in Melbourne on station GTV-9, as this was prior to the creation of the Seven Network and Nine Network (it is not known if it was also shown in Adelaide, Brisbane or Perth).

It was part of The General Motors Hour, a loosely scheduled occasional series which presented various types of one-off local productions.

Australian TV drama was relatively rare at the time.

Cast

 Brian James as Kirk
 Leonard Teale as Jack Rigger
 Kurt Ludescher as Condringer
 Ben Gabriel
 Thelma Scott
 Lynne Murphy as Rigger's wife
 John Gray
 Henry Gilbert
 Stuart Finch
 Peter McCredie

Production

The production was shot in Sydney at ATN's studios. Cul Cullen, art director, researched details at Sydney libraries.

Kurt Ledescher was a European actor who had only just arrived in Australia. The production aired a few weeks after the American version had been made.

Brian Wright, who appeared in the show, had written the radio serial Hop Harrigan which had starred Bruce Stewart a number of years earlier. It was an early TV role for Leonard Teale.

Gwen Plumb wrote in her memoirs that a brown horse was used and the crew covered it in Johnson's Baby Powder to make it look ghostly. "It really looked ghostly," she wrote. But the powder made the horse sneeze and shake himself "and a white cloud enshrouded the studio." They tried it two much times, then gave up. Plumb says someone then had the idea of whitewashing the horse. "And they did! That poor beast."

In one six minute scene only one camera was used.

Reception
The Sydney Morning Herald said "in almost every respect" the show "was a success."

The Age called it "disappointing."

The show won Best Drama at the 1961 Logie Awards.

It was repeated in Melbourne on 21 October 1961 and in Sydney on 12 October 1960 and 28 October 1961.

The play was performed on Australian radio in 1965.

See also
 List of television plays broadcast on ATN-7

References

External links
 ''Shadow of a Pale Horse on IMDb
 Shadow of a Pale Horse at National Film and Sound Archive
 Shadow of a Pale Horse at Austlit

1960 television films
1960 films
Australian television films
English-language television shows
Black-and-white Australian television shows
1960s Australian television plays
Films directed by David Cahill